Khalif Quadree Mitchell (born April 7, 1985) is a professional Canadian football and American Football defensive tackle who is currently a free agent. He has played for the B.C. Lions, Toronto Argonauts in the CFL and San Francisco 49ers in the NFL. In 2011, he won a Grey Cup with the BC Lions. He was signed by the San Francisco 49ers as an undrafted free agent in 2009 and released in 2010.

Professional career

San Francisco 49ers
After going undrafted in the 2009 NFL Draft, Mitchell was signed by the San Francisco 49ers as an undrafted free agent on May 1, 2009. He was waived on September 5, and subsequently signed to the practice squad on September 6. He was released from the practice squad on September 8 and later re-signed to the practice squad on October 13. He was released in early September 2010.

BC Lions
Mitchell was signed by the BC Lions of the Canadian Football League on September 21, 2010. He was added to the team's 46-man playing roster as a nose tackle, and activated to the team's 42-man game day roster against the Calgary Stampeders for September 25. With limited playing time in the 2010 CFL season Mitchell only recorded 6 tackles. In Mitchell's second year in the league he earned 2011 CFL All-Star honors with 33 tackles and 6 sacks. In 2011, he won the 99th Grey Cup while playing for the Lions. He re-signed with the BC Lions on January 16, 2012.

Mitchell was suspended by the CFL on July 23, 2012, for two games without pay after he violently hyperextended the arm of Edmonton Eskimos offensive lineman Simeon Rottier.  After another game, the league also fined him an unspecified amount for making a number of throat-slashing gestures.

Mitchell caused a controversy for what were understood as racist remarks offensive to people of Chinese descent that he made on Twitter regarding the 2012 US Presidential election debate between Mitt Romney and Barack Obama. Michell was suspended for one game for his remarks, and fined an undisclosed amount of money. His problems started when he tweeted "My teammate said who I think Won the debate. I said the American Ppl. Cause if they watched carefully BOTH OF THEM Hide Money with the Chinks". He later explained "So I Never knew "Chink" was racist. I def. meant no harm. I was referring to Obama & Romney putting their personal trust in Chinese Banks."

Toronto Argonauts
On April 2, 2013, the BC Lions traded Mitchell to the Toronto Argonauts for defensive end Adrian Awasom and the rights to an unnamed negotiation list player. Not long after the trade Mitchell began voicing his displeasure with being traded to Toronto. He announced that he would not be attending the Argonauts training camp scheduled to begin on June 1, 2013. Mitchell wanted to be traded to Calgary or Edmonton, or have the trade between the Lions and Argos reversed and have the Lions release him. His future with the Argos was surrounded in uncertainty.

Mitchell changed his mind and was present for mandatory training camp at the start of June 2013. TSN sports reporter Farhan Lalji reported that Mitchell agreed to play the 2013 season with the Argos, under the condition that he be released following the season to pursue employment in the NFL.

Mitchell for the season played in 16 games, recording 32 tackles, five sacks (team high for the season) and one fumble recovery. He was named a CFL East All-Star and a CFL All-Star. On March 10, 2014, Mitchell was released by the Argos.

BC Lions (II)
Despite rumors Mitchell would sign with an NFL franchise for the 2014 season, Mitchell signed a contract with the BC Lions of the CFL on May 6, 2014. Mitchell did not have a significant impact on the Lions defense during the 2014 season. He finished the season with only 9 tackles and 1 sack. Following the season he was not re-signed by the Lions, and became a free-agent on February 10, 2015.

Montreal Alouettes
On February 18, 2015, Mitchell signed a 3-year contract with the Montreal Alouettes of the Canadian Football League. He was, however, released before the regular season began in 2015 for tweeting a Holocaust denial video and failing to remove the posts from his Twitter page.

Saskatchewan Roughriders
On August 31, 2016, midway through the 2016 CFL season Mitchell signed with the Saskatchewan Roughriders as a practice squad member. On September 12, he was released from the team due to "being unfit". After having made additional outspoken remarks about the Jewish community, Khalif Mitchell was advised he had little leeway for expressing what he described as an opinion and that any additional remarks that garnish negative attention would result in his immediate dismissal.

Sioux Falls Storm
On February 7, 2017, Mitchell signed with the Sioux Falls Storm of the Indoor Football League as a starting defensive lineman. As of June 2017, he is currently leading the team in sacks and tackles and is 7th in the entire league. Mitchell and the Storm lost the United Bowl against the Arizona Rattlers on July 7, 2017.

References

External links
 BC Lions bio 
 San Francisco 49ers bio
 East Carolina Pirates football bio

1985 births
Living people
Sportspeople from Virginia Beach, Virginia
Players of American football from Virginia
American football defensive tackles
East Carolina Pirates football players
San Francisco 49ers players
BC Lions players
Sioux Falls Storm players